Jan Klapáč (born February 27, 1941) is a Czech former professional ice hockey player, born in Prague, Protectorate of Bohemia and Moravia. He is the grandfather of alpine skier and snowboarder Ester Ledecká.

References

External links

1941 births
HC Dukla Jihlava players
Ice hockey players at the 1964 Winter Olympics
Ice hockey players at the 1968 Winter Olympics
Living people
Medalists at the 1964 Winter Olympics
Medalists at the 1968 Winter Olympics
Olympic bronze medalists for Czechoslovakia
Olympic ice hockey players of Czechoslovakia
Olympic medalists in ice hockey
Olympic silver medalists for Czechoslovakia
Ice hockey people from Prague
Czech ice hockey right wingers
Czechoslovak ice hockey right wingers